Mailsi, is a subdivision tehsil,   of  Vehari District, in the Punjab province of Pakistan. It is administratively subdivided into 31 Union Councils, two of which form the tehsil capital Mailsi.

Administration
The tehsil of Mailsi is administratively subdivided into 31 Union Councils, these are:

References

 

Vehari District
Tehsils of Punjab, Pakistan